Village School may refer to:

 a one-room school, or "village school"
 Village School,  a 1955 novel by Miss Read.

Schools

United Kingdom
 The Village School (London)
United States
 Village School (Campbell, California)
 Village School (Pacific Palisades, California)
 Village School (Unity, Maine)
 Village School (Holmdel, New Jersey)
 Village Elementary School, Princeton Junction, New Jersey
 Village School (Great Neck, New York)
 Village School (Charlottesville, Virginia)
 The Village School (Royalston, Massachusetts)
 The Village School (Eugene, Oregon)
 The Village School (Houston, Texas)
 The Village School (Richardson, Texas)
 Auburn Village School, Auburn, New Hampshire

Australia
 Village School (Croydon North, Victoria)